The Mayor of Cape Town is the head of the local government of Cape Town, South Africa; currently that government takes the form of the City of Cape Town Metropolitan Municipality. In the past, the position of Mayor has varied between that of an executive mayor actively governing the city and that of a figurehead mayor with a mostly ceremonial role. The current mayor is Geordin Hill-Lewis of the Democratic Alliance (DA)

Current office
This is a list of mayors of Cape Town in South Africa:

City of Cape Town (December 2000–present)

Historic offices

Metropolitan Local Councils (June 1996–December 2000)

Cape Metropolitan Council (CMC)

 Attie Adriaanse (2000) (NNP)
 Rev William Bantom (1996 - 2000)  (NNP)

City of Cape Town Municipality (Central Substructure)

 Nomaindia Mfeketo (1998 - 2000) (ANC)
 Theresa Solomons (1996 - 1998) (ANC)

City of Tygerberg Municipality (Tygerberg Substructure)

 Clifford Sitonga (1999 - 2000) (ANC)
 Lukas Olivier (1996 - 1999) (NNP)

South Peninsula Municipality (Southern Substructure)

 John Oswald "OJ" Jacobs (1996 - 2000) (NNP)

Helderberg Municipality (Helderberg Substructure)

 James Matthews (1996 - 2000) (NNP)

Oostenberg Municipality (Eastern Substructure)

 Danny De La Cruz (1996 - 2000) (NNP)

Blaauwberg Municipality (Northern Substructure)

 Desmond Stoffberg (1999 - 2000) (NNP)
 Heather Maneveld (1997 - 1999) (NNP)
 Algene Ross (1996 - 1997) (NNP)

City of Cape Town Transitional Council (February 1995–June 1996)

 Rev William Bantom (1995 - 1996) (NP)

Mayors prior to nonracial dispensation

(Unless otherwise indicated, names are taken from the cumulative list of mayors published in the annual Mayor's Minutes)

 Patricia Kreiner (1993 - 1995)
 Clive Keegan (1993)
 Frank van der Velde (1991 - 1993)
 Gordon Oliver (1989 - 1991)
 Peter Muller (1987 - 1989)
 Leon Markowitz (1985 - 1987)
 Sol Kreiner (1983 - 1985)
 M.J. van Zyl (1981 - 1983)
 Louis Kreiner (1979 - 1981)
 Edward Mauerberger (1977 - 1979)
 John Tyers (1975 - 1977)
 David Bloomberg (1973 - 1975)
 Richard Friedlander (1971 - 1973)
 Jan Dommisse (1969 - 1971)
 Gerald Ferry (1967 - 1969)
 Walter Gradner (1965 - 1967)
 William Peters(1963 - 1965)
 Alfred Honikman (1961 - 1963)
 Joyce Newton-Thompson (1959 - 1961), first female Mayor
 Colonel John Orville Billingham (1957 - 1959)
 Pieter Wolmarans (1955 - 1957)
 Arthur Keen (1953 - 1955)
 Fritz Sonnenberg(1951 - 1953)
 Charles Booth (1949 - 1951)
 Herbert Gearing (1947 - 1949)
 Abe Bloomberg (1945 - 1947)
 Ernest Nyman (1943 - 1945)
 Walter James (1941 - 1943)
 Wilfred Brinton (1939 - 1941)
 WC Foster (1937 - 1939)
 James Low (1935 - 1937)
 Louis Gradner (1933 - 1935)
 Henry Stephan (1931 - 1933)
 Rev Alfred Lewis (South African politician) (1929 - 1931)
 Andrew Reid (South African politician) (1927 - 1929)
 William Fish (South African politician) (1925 - 1927)
 Ryno J. Verster (1922 - 1925)
 William Gardener (1920 - 1922)
 William J. Thorne (South African politician) (1918 - 1920)
 Sir Harry Hands (1915 - 1918) (second term)
 John Parker (1913 - 1915), first Mayor of "Greater" Cape Town after surrounding municipalities had been incorporated into the city
 Harry Hands (1912 - 1913) (first term) 
 Sir Frank Smith (1908 - 1912)
 William Duncan Baxter (1907 - 1908)
 Hyman Liberman (1904 - 1907)
 Sir William Thorne (1901 - 1904)
 Thomas O'Reilly (1900 - 1901) (second term)
 Thomas Ball (1898 - 1900)
 Herman Boalch (1897 - 1898) (died in office)
 Sir John Woodhead (1896 - 1897) (fourth term)
 James Attwell (1895 - 1896)
 George Smart (1894 - 1895)
 John Woodhead (1893 - 1894) (third term)
 Johan Mocke (1892 - 1893)
 David Pieter de Villiers Graaff (1890 - 1892), later Minister of Public Works and Finance 
 David Christiaan de Waal (1889 - 1890)
 John Woodhead (1888 - 1889) (second term)
 Thomas O'Reilly (1887 - 1888) (first term)
 John Woodhead (1886 - 1887) (first term)
 Thomas Inglesby (1885 - 1886), former honorary Colonel of Cape Field Artillery
 Philip Stigant (1884 - 1885) (third term)
 Charles Lewis (1883 - 1884) (second term)
 William Fleming (1881 - 1883)
 Petrus Kotzé (1879 - 1881)
 Jan Christoffel Hofmeyr (1878 - 1879)
 John Philip (1877 - 1878) 
 Charles Lewis (1876 - 1877) (first term)
 P.U. Leibbrandt (1875 - 1876)
 Philip Stigant (1874 - 1875) (second term)
 Gillis J. de Korte (1872 - 1874) (third term)
 Philip Stigant (1871-1872) (first term)
 Gillis J. de Korte (1866 - 1871) (second term), title changed from "chairman" to "mayor" in 1867
 D. G. van Breda (1865 - 1866) (second term)
 Joseph Barry (1863 - 1865)
 Thomas Watson (1863)
 W. Herman (1862 - 1863)
 Gillis J. de Korte (1860 - 1862) (first term)
 D. G. van Breda (1860) (first term)
 Hercules Crosse Jarvis (1848 - 1860)
 J. J. L. Smuts (1844 - 1848)
 Michiel van Breda (1840 - 1844), first Chairman of the Cape Town Municipality

See also
 Timeline of Cape Town

References

External links
 Official website

 
Government of Cape Town
Cape Town
1840 establishments in the British Empire